Thomas Michael Zacharias (born 2 January 1947) is a German high jumper. He competed in the 1968 Olympics and finished in 14th place with a jump of 2.09 m. He set five national records (2.17 to 2.20 in 1970). His personal best is 2.22 m (world's best indoor 1971).

Zacharias continues competing internationally, in the masters categories, where he set dozens of world records. Two of them, 2.00 m indoor and 1.98 m outdoor in the M50 age group, have stood since 1997. Zacharias is a lifelong proponent of the straddle technique in the high jump.

(i) = indoors, WR = world record, ER = European record, NR = national record

Biography
Zacharias was born to Hella and Helmut Zacharias. His father (died 2002) was a famous violin player, composer and orchestra director, his sister Sylvia holds a PhD in social sciences, and his brother Stephan is a composer and music producer  for film and television. Zacharias has a son, Alejandro, and daughter Cristina, with Lola López, a sports teacher.

Zacharias completed his school studies in Hamburg (Germany), Genoa (Italy) and Ascona (Switzerland). He continued his education in Paris, Berlin and Mainz, studying philosophy and psychology, but majoring in physical education, and since the 1980s has lived on Lanzarote, one of the Canary Islands. In the 2000s, besides competing in the high jump and being a track and field coach, he became a specialist in golf biomechanics and tuition and published two books on the subject. In 1999–2002 he worked as a psychologist with the national golf amateur team and in 2002-2008 was instruction advisor to the PGA of Germany.

Books

Thomas Zacharias (1997) Hoch- und Weitsprung Perfekt, Nentershausen 
Thomas Zacharias (2007) Golfprofis schwingen nicht – sie schlagen: Die richtige Technik verstehen und erlernen. Kosmos. 
Thomas Zacharias (2011) Der neue Golfschlag. Kosmos.

References

1947 births
Living people
Athletes (track and field) at the 1968 Summer Olympics
Olympic athletes of West Germany
German male high jumpers
Sportspeople from Lower Saxony